Mohammad Saufi Mat Senan (born 10 October 1990) is a Malaysian professional cyclist, who last rode for UCI Continental team .

Major results

2009
3rd Overall Tengku Mahkota Pahang Trophy
2012
1st Stage 5 Tour of Thailand
1st Stage 2 Tour of Hainan
2013
6th Overall Tour de Taiwan
10th Road race, Southeast Asian Games

External links

Malaysian male cyclists
1990 births
Living people
Southeast Asian Games medalists in cycling
Southeast Asian Games silver medalists for Malaysia
Competitors at the 2013 Southeast Asian Games
20th-century Malaysian people
21st-century Malaysian people